Lethe moelleri ,   Moeller's silverfork, is a species of Satyrinae butterfly found in the  Indomalayan realm (Bhutan, Sikkim  to Guanxi and, as subspecies bruno Tytler, 1939, Burma)

References

moelleri
Butterflies of Asia